"Undivided" is a song recorded by American country music singers Tim McGraw and Tyler Hubbard, the latter of whom is one-half of Florida Georgia Line. The song, which Hubbard wrote with Chris Loocke, was released on January 13, 2021, and is on the deluxe version of McGraw's album Here on Earth. The song is the album's second single. This marks McGraw and Hubbard's second collaboration after 2016's "May We All".

Content
Tyler Hubbard, who is one-half of the duo Florida Georgia Line, wrote the song with Chris Loocke in 2020. He said that he wrote the song in November 2020 while under quarantine during the COVID-19 pandemic.

According to Tim McGraw, Hubbard sent him the song months before the 2021 storming of the United States Capitol. McGraw and Hubbard produced the track along with McGraw's longtime producer Byron Gallimore and Florida Georgia Line's producer, Corey Crowder.

Billy Dukes of Taste of Country describes the song as a "peppy, pop-friendly country bop simply asks us to treat our neighbors with decency and kindness." The song has a central theme of unity among those with differing viewpoints.

McGraw and Hubbard performed the song live at the inauguration ceremony for Joe Biden as the 46th President of the United States.

Charts

Weekly charts

Year-end charts

Certifications

References

2021 singles
2021 songs
Big Machine Records singles
Tyler Hubbard songs
Tim McGraw songs
Male vocal duets
Song recordings produced by Byron Gallimore
Songs written by Tyler Hubbard
Songs against racism and xenophobia